Ellenborough River, a perennial river of the Hastings River catchment, is located in the Mid North Coast region of New South Wales, Australia.

Course and features
Ellenborough River rises on the eastern slopes of the Great Dividing Range, southwest of Blue Knob, and flows generally northeast before reaching its confluence with the Hastings River, near Ellenborough. The river descends  over its  course.

The river descends over Ellenborough Falls, a sheer drop of circa , located on the middle reaches of the river, south of Biriwal Bulga National Park.

See also

 Rivers of New South Wales
 List of rivers of Australia

References

External links
 

 

Rivers of New South Wales
Mid North Coast